This article lists each prime minister of Turkey in order of term length. The list starts with heads of the Government of the Grand National Assembly on May 3, 1920, and the first prime minister, Mustafa Kemal Atatürk. It includes all prime ministers since then, up to the last prime minister. The list is based on the difference between dates; if counted by number of calendar days, figures would be one day greater for each term served.

Of the 30 prime ministers, 4 served more than 10 years while seven served less than a year. İsmet İnönü is the longest-serving Turkish Prime Ministers with 16 years accumulated in total. The prime minister with the longest single term was Recep Tayyip Erdoğan, lasting 11 years from 2003 until 2014.

Ordered by tenure
In this table, "Term of office" is the number of separate, discontiguous periods served as Prime Minister.

By party

See also
 List of prime ministers of Turkey
 List of prime ministers of Canada by time in office
 List of prime ministers of New Zealand by time in office
 List of prime ministers of the United Kingdom by length of tenure

References

External links
 

Turkey
Time in office